The 2010–11 Welsh Premier League was the second season of the Welsh Premier League (women), Wales' premier football league. The league was increased to ten teams this season.

Teams 

The league was increased from 8 to 10 teams, 5 per conference.

The new teams were Llandudno Junction Ladies in the north, a planned newcomer, as were Caerphilly Castle Ladies in the south. Trefelin Ladies were the third newcomer, replacing Manorbier Ladies, who withdrew from the league.

Northern conference

Standings

Results

Southern conference

Standings
Somehow Newcastle wasn't relegated.

Results

Final
The final was played on 15 May 2011 and contested by the same teams as last year. Swansea won 3–1 and thus entered the 2011–12 UEFA Women's Champions League as Welsh champion.

Notes

Wales Women
Women
2010-11
1